Julius Bredt (29 March 1855 – 21 September 1937) was a German organic chemist.  He was the first to determine, in 1893, the correct structure of camphor.  Bredt also discovered that a double bond cannot be placed at the bridgehead of a bridged ring system, a statement now known as Bredt's rule.

Awards 
There is a Julius Bredt lecture in his remembrance at the RWTH Aachen University.

Further reading

References 

1855 births
1937 deaths
19th-century German chemists
Organic chemists
20th-century German chemists
Scientists from Berlin
Academic staff of RWTH Aachen University